The 15th Washington D.C. Area Film Critics Association Awards were announced on December 5, 2016.

Winners and nominees

Best Film
 La La Land
 Arrival
 Hell or High Water
 Manchester by the Sea
 Moonlight

Best Director
 Damien Chazelle – La La Land
 Barry Jenkins – Moonlight
 Kenneth Lonergan – Manchester by the Sea
 David Mackenzie – Hell or High Water
 Denis Villeneuve – Arrival

Best Actor
 Casey Affleck – Manchester by the Sea
 Joel Edgerton – Loving
 Andrew Garfield – Hacksaw Ridge
 Ryan Gosling – La La Land
 Denzel Washington – Fences

Best Actress
 Natalie Portman – Jackie
 Amy Adams – Arrival
 Annette Bening – 20th Century Women
 Ruth Negga – Loving
 Emma Stone – La La Land

Best Supporting Actor
 Mahershala Ali – Moonlight
 Jeff Bridges – Hell or High Water
 Ben Foster – Hell or High Water
 Lucas Hedges – Manchester by the Sea
 Michael Shannon – Nocturnal Animals

Best Supporting Actress
 Viola Davis – Fences
 Greta Gerwig – 20th Century Women
 Naomie Harris – Moonlight
 Molly Shannon – Other People
 Michelle Williams – Manchester by the Sea

Best Adapted Screenplay
 Eric Heisserer – Arrival
 Luke Davies – Lion
 Tom Ford – Nocturnal Animals
 Patrick Ness – A Monster Calls
 August Wilson – Fences

Best Original Screenplay
 Damien Chazelle – La La Land
 Barry Jenkins and Tarell Alvin McCraney – Moonlight
 Yorgos Lanthimos and Efthimis Filippou – The Lobster
 Kenneth Lonergan – Manchester by the Sea
 Taylor Sheridan – Hell or High Water

Best Ensemble
 Hell or High Water
 20th Century Women
 Fences
 Manchester by the Sea
 Moonlight

Best Animated Film
 Kubo and the Two Strings
 Finding Dory
 Moana
 Sausage Party
 Zootopia

Best Documentary Film
 13th
 Gleason
 I Am Not Your Negro
 O.J.: Made in America
 Weiner

Best Foreign Language Film
 Elle • France The Handmaiden • South Korea
 Julieta • Spain
 The Salesman • France / Iran
 Toni Erdmann • Austria / GermanyBest Art Direction David Wasco and Sandy Reynolds-Wasco – La La Land
 Stuart Craig and Anna Pinnock – Fantastic Beasts and Where to Find Them
 Paul Hotte and Patrice Vermette – Arrival
 Craig Lathrop – The Witch
 Véronique Melery and Jean Rabasse – Jackie

Best Cinematography
 Linus Sandgren – La La Land
 Stéphane Fontaine – Jackie
 James Laxton – Moonlight
 Seamus McGarvey – Nocturnal Animals
 Bradford Young – Arrival

Best Editing
 Tom Cross – La La Land
 Joi McMillon and Nat Sanders – Moonlight
 Blu Murray – Sully
 Sebastián Sepúlveda – Jackie
 Joe Walker – Arrival

Best Original Score
 Justin Hurwitz – La La Land
 Nicholas Britell – Moonlight
 Jóhann Jóhannsson – Arrival
 Mica Levi – Jackie
 Cliff Martinez – The Neon Demon

Best Youth Performance
 Lucas Hedges – Manchester by the Sea
 Lewis MacDougall – A Monster Calls
 Sunny Pawar – Lion
 Hailee Steinfeld – The Edge of Seventeen
 Anya Taylor-Joy – The Witch

Best Animated Voice Performance
 Liam Neeson – A Monster Calls
 Jason Bateman – Zootopia
 Auliʻi Cravalho – Moana
 Ellen DeGeneres – Finding Dory
 Ginnifer Goodwin – Zootopia

Best Motion Capture Performance
 Mark Rylance – The BFG
 Liam Neeson – A Monster Calls

The Joe Barber Award for Best Portrayal of Washington, D.C.
 Jackie
 Jason Bourne
 Loving
 Miss Sloane
 Snowden

Multiple nominations and awards

These films had multiple nominations:

 9 nominations: La La Land and Moonlight
 8 nominations: Arrival and Manchester by the Sea
 6 nominations: Hell or High Water and Jackie
 4 nominations: Fences and A Monster Calls
 3 nominations: 20th Century Women, Loving, Nocturnal Animals, and Zootopia
 2 nominations: Finding Dory, Lion, Moana, and The Witch

The following films received multiple awards:

 7 wins: La La Land
 2 wins: Jackie and Manchester by the Sea

References

External links
 The Washington D.C. Area Film Critics Association

2016
2016 film awards